Ajayi is both a surname and a given name of Yoruba origin. Notable people with the name include:

Surname
 Florence Ajayi (born 1977), Nigerian footballer
 GOK Ajayi  (1931–2014), Nigerian lawyer, solicitor, and judge
 Goodness Ohiremen Ajayi (born 1994), Nigerian footballer
 J. F. Ade Ajayi (1929–2014), Nigerian historian
 Jay Ajayi (born 1993), American football player
 Joseph Olatunji Ajayi, Nigerian senator
 Kunle Ajayi (born 1964), Nigerian gospel singer and musician
 Samuel Ajayi (born 1984), Nigerian footballer
 Semi Ajayi (born 1993), English footballer
 Tolu Ajayi (born 1946), Nigerian poet and writer

Given name
 Ajayi Agbebaku (born 1955), Nigerian triple jumper
 Samuel Ajayi Crowther, (1809–1891) Nigerian clergy

Fictional
Nathan Ajayi, Art teacher in Heartstopper

Yoruba-language surnames
Yoruba given names